Hypocalinae is a subfamily of moths in the family Erebidae.

Genera
 Aon Neumögen, 1892
 Goniapteryx Perty, 1833
 Hypocala Guenée, 1852
 Hypsoropha Hübner, 1818
 Psammathodoxa Dyar, 1921

References

 
Moth subfamilies